The Hartington Hotel in Hartington, Nebraska, is an Early Commercial-style hotel which was built during 1916–17.  It was listed on the National Register of Historic Places in 2003.

It was deemed significant as "an excellent example of a small town commercial hotel."

Construction during 1916 was interrupted by a strike;  bricklayers had been promised 80 cents per hour wages but the company was willing to pay only 75 cents.

References

External links
More photos of Hartington Hotel at Wikimedia Commons

Hotel buildings on the National Register of Historic Places in Nebraska
Buildings designated early commercial in the National Register of Historic Places
Hotel buildings completed in 1917
Buildings and structures in Cedar County, Nebraska
Hotels in Nebraska
1917 establishments in Nebraska